Beta-1,3-N-acetylgalactosaminyltransferase 2 is a protein that in humans is encoded by the B3GALNT2 gene.

Function

This gene encodes a member of the glycosyltransferase 31 family. The encoded protein synthesizes GalNAc:beta-1,3GlcNAc, a novel carbohydrate structure, on N- and O-glycans. Alternatively spliced transcript variants that encode different isoforms have been described. [provided by RefSeq, Mar 2013].

References

Further reading 

Genes
Human proteins